Rhaphiptera is a genus of longhorn beetles of the subfamily Lamiinae, containing the following species:

 Rhaphiptera affinis Thomson, 1868
 Rhaphiptera albicans Breuning, 1940
 Rhaphiptera albipennis Breuning, 1947
 Rhaphiptera alvarengai Fragoso & Monné, 1984
 Rhaphiptera annulicornis Gounelle, 1908
 Rhaphiptera apeara Galileo & Martins, 2011
 Rhaphiptera avicenniae Dalens & Tavakilian, 2007
 Rhaphiptera boliviana Galileo & Martins, 2007
 Rhaphiptera candicans Gounelle, 1908
 Rhaphiptera clarevestita Tippmann, 1953
 Rhaphiptera durantoni Tavakilian & Touroult, 2007
 Rhaphiptera elegans Breuning, 1961
 Rhaphiptera gahani Gounelle, 1908
 Rhaphiptera lavaissierorum Dalens & Tavakilian, 2007
 Rhaphiptera melzeri Fragoso & Monné, 1984
 Rhaphiptera nodifera Audinet-Serville, 1835
 Rhaphiptera obtusipennis Melzer, 1935
 Rhaphiptera oculata Gounelle, 1908
 Rhaphiptera pallens Gounelle, 1908
 Rhaphiptera punctulata Thomson, 1868
 Rhaphiptera rixator Thomson, 1868 
 Rhaphiptera roppai Fragoso & Monné, 1984
 Rhaphiptera scrutator Thomson, 1868
 Rhaphiptera seabrai Fragoso & Monné, 1984
 Rhaphiptera tavakiliani Fragoso & Monné, 1984
 Rhaphiptera triangulifera Lane, 1974

References

 
Pteropliini